The Fiat A.74 was a two-row, fourteen-cylinder, air-cooled radial engine produced in Italy in the 1930s as a powerplant for aircraft. It was used in some of Italy's most important aircraft of World War II.

Design and development
The A.74 marked a transition for Fiat from liquid-cooled inline engines, to large air-cooled radial engines.  Fiat had made a number of smaller radial air engines over the years but the A.74 marked a major increase in power and size.  The A.74 family was widely produced and spawned a number of related engines such as the A.76, A.80, and A.82,  each successive generation being larger and more powerful than the previous. The entire series grew from 14 cylinders to 18 cylinders with a power output of 870 hp to 1,400 hp.

Variants
A.74 R.C.18 With reduction gear and supercharger, rated altitude .
A.74 R.C.38 With reduction gear and supercharger, rated altitude .
A.74 R.C.38D
A.74 R.C.38S
A.74 R.I.C.38 With reduction gear, fuel injection and supercharger, rated altitude .
A.74 R.C.42 With reduction gear and supercharger, rated altitude .

Applications
CANSA FC.20
Fiat CR.42
Fiat G.50
Fiat RS.14
Ikarus Orkan
Macchi C.200

Specifications (A.74)

See also

References

 oldengine.org 

Aircraft air-cooled radial piston engines
A.74
1930s aircraft piston engines